Rublyovka is a rural locality (a selo) in Umlekansky Selsoviet of Zeysky District, Amur Oblast, Russia. The population was 84 as of 2018. There are 4 streets.

Geography 
Rublyovka is located near the left bank of the Zeya River, 82 km south of Zeya (the district's administrative centre) by road. Umlekan is the nearest rural locality.

References 

Rural localities in Zeysky District